Eremophila dempsteri is a flowering plant in the figwort family, Scrophulariaceae and is endemic to the south of Western Australia. It is an erect shrub with many upright stems, short, hooked leaves and pinkish-purple to white flowers with distinctive woolly sepals.

Description
The branches have many raised resin glands making them sticky near the tips and there are grooves under the leaf bases.

The petal tube is usually lilac-coloured  to white and lacks spots. The outside of the petal tube and petal lobes are hairy. The 4 stamens are fully enclosed in the petal tube.

Taxonomy and naming
Eremophila dempsteri was first formally described by Ferdinand von Mueller in 1876 and the description was published in Fragmenta phytographiae Australiae. The specific epithet (dempsteri) honours Andrew Dempster, who was the son of the politician, Charles Dempster and who was an explorer and collector of the type specimen.

Distribution and habitat
This eremophila is common between Balladonia, Coolgardie, Hyden, Cocklebiddy and Salmon Gums in woodland, growing in red-brown and calcareous soils.

Conservation status
Eremophila dempsteri is classified as "not threatened" by the Government of Western Australia Department of Parks and Wildlife.

Use in horticulture
This eremophila has unusual flowers and an attractive habit making it useful as a specimen shrub. Its growth form also allows it to be used with other shrubs as a screening plant. It can be propagated from cuttings which may take a year to strike or by grafting onto Myoporum species. It will grow in most soils in full sun or part shade, is tolerant of drought and is not damaged by severe frosts.

References

dempsteri
Eudicots of Western Australia
Plants described in 1876
Endemic flora of Western Australia
Taxa named by Ferdinand von Mueller